Llongote is a mountain in the Cordillera Central in the Andes of Peru which reaches a height of approximately  . It is located in the Lima Region, Yauyos Province, in the districts of Ayaviri, Carania and Yauyos. Llongote lies south of Qutuni and southeast of Huayna Cotoni and the lake named Huascacocha. It is situated on the southern border of the Nor Yauyos-Cochas Landscape Reserve.

References

Mountains of Peru
Mountains of Lima Region